Torbanlea is a rural town and locality in the Fraser Coast Region, Queensland, Australia. In the  the locality of Torbanlea had a population of 791 people.

Geography 
The Burrum River forms the western and northern boundary of the locality. The town is located on the north-western edge of the locality. The North Coast railway line passes through Torbanlea from the south-east to the north with the Torbanlea railway station in the town centre. The Bruce Highway runs through the locality parallel and south of the railway line, bypassing the town centre.

Apart from the town centre, the principal land use is farming mostly along the river and along the highway. The hillier parts of the locality in the south-east are undeveloped bushland.

History 
The name Torbanlea is believed to have been suggested by mining manager, James Robertson, after Torbane Hill in Scotland.

Torbanlea State School opened on 26 September 1887.

Torbanlea Primitive Methodist Church opened on Sunday 22 March 1891 by Reverend John Prowse. Prior to this Reverend E. Knight held services in Torbanlea under a tree and in the Reading Room hall. With the amalgamation of the Methodist denominations circa 1900, the church became the Torbanlea Methodist Church. With the amalgamation of the Methodist Church into the Uniting Church in Australia in 1977, it became the Torbanlea Uniting Church. The church is now closed and the congregation amalgamated with the Howard Uniting Church. The church was sold into private ownership in November 2015 for $80,000. As at August 2020, the church building at 12 Gympie Street is still extant.

St Stephen's Anglican Church opened circa 1896. It closed circa 1988. It was at 10 Crawford Street. It was sold into private ownership in September 1989 for $25,000. As at August 2020, the church building is still extant, but modified to become a private residence.

An accident at a nearby colliery killed five workers in 1900.

In May 1984, the Bruce Highway bypass was opened. Previously the highway had run through the town on Robertson Street. Neighbouring Howard was also bypassed as part of same project.

In the  the locality of Torbanlea had a population of 791 people.

Economy 
Torbanlea was a coal mining town.  The manufacture of more than 60 trains at a facility in Torbanlea is planned ahead of the 2032 Brisbane Olympic Games.  This represented the largest investment in train manufacturing in the state. The publicly owned facilities cost an estimated $239 million to build.

Education 
Torbanlea State School is a government primary (Prep-6) school for boys and girls at Pialba Road. In 2018, the school had an enrolment of 305 students with 24 teachers (22 full-time equivalent) and 15 non-teaching staff (11 full-time equivalent). It includes a special education program.

There is no secondary school in Torbanlea. The nearest government secondary schools are Hervey Bay State High School in Pialba in Hervey Bay to the north-east and Aldridge State High School in Maryborough to the south.

Amenities 
Howard/Torbanlea Uniting Church is in Coal Street, Howard. It is part of the Mary Burnett Presbytery of the Uniting Church in Australia.

References

Further reading

External links 

 
 

Fraser Coast Region
Localities in Queensland